Robin Givens (born November 27, 1964) is an American actress, model and director.

Givens landed her breakthrough role of Darlene Merriman in the ABC sitcom Head of the Class in 1986, and remained on the series for its five-year duration. Her troubled marriage to boxer Mike Tyson from 1988 drew considerable media attention, as did their acrimonious divorce. She later went on to become a spokesperson for the National Domestic Violence Hotline for several years.

Givens continued her career with film and television roles such as The Women of Brewster Place (1989) and Boomerang (1992). In 1996, Givens co-starred on the sitcom Sparks, which aired for two seasons on UPN. In January 2000, she took over hosting duties on the syndicated talk show Forgive or Forget. In 2007, Givens released her autobiography, Grace Will Lead Me Home. She has since had recurring roles on The Game, Tyler Perry's House of Payne, Chuck, Riverdale and its spin-off Katy Keene, and has been part of the main cast of Batwoman.

Early life
Givens' mother raised Robin and her sister Stephanie in Mount Vernon and New Rochelle, New York. Givens was raised Catholic. She occasionally modeled and acted as a teen. As a model, she appeared in magazines such as Seventeen and Mademoiselle. She made her film debut at age 14 in the film The Wiz (1978) as a guest at Aunt Emma's Party.

Givens graduated from New Rochelle Academy (a private school which closed in June 1987). At the age of 15, she enrolled at Sarah Lawrence College as a pre-medical major, becoming one of the youngest to attend the school. While in school she acted in daytime dramas. She graduated at the age of 19 in 1984. Givens claimed to have dropped out of Harvard Medical School to focus on her acting career, but the registrar's office stated that she never applied. It was later reported that she took courses at Harvard Graduate School of Arts and Sciences.

Career

1980s–1990s
In 1985, Givens auditioned for a guest spot on The Cosby Show. She won the spot and Bill Cosby became her mentor. He persuaded her to drop out of school and promised that if she wasn't successful in two years, he'd get her back into medical school and pay her tuition. Soon after Givens appeared in Diff'rent Strokes and the 1986 television film Beverly Hills Madam, opposite Faye Dunaway. That same year, she landed her breakthrough role as rich girl Darlene Merriman on the ABC sitcom Head of the Class. The series lasted five seasons, ending in 1991. In 1989, while starring in Head of the Class, she appeared in The Women of Brewster Place with Oprah Winfrey. She later appeared in Boomerang (1992).

In 1994, Givens posed nude for Playboy magazine. During that period Givens felt she had lost her voice, so one of the reasons why she posed for the magazine was so that she could write her own article. Givens was ranked No. 88 on Empire magazine's "100 Sexiest Stars in Film History" list in May 1995. In 1996, Givens portrayed Claudia in the television movie The Face (also known as A Face to Die For) with Yasmine Bleeth. Later that year, she co-starred in the UPN sitcom Sparks, which ended its run in 1998. She also played Denise in The Fresh Prince of Bel-Air.

2000s–2010s
In January 2000, Givens appeared in a cameo in Toni Braxton's music video "He Wasn't Man Enough", as the wife of a cheating husband. She returned to the entertainment industry later that year as the host of the talk show Forgive or Forget, replacing television personality Mother Love halfway through the show's second season. Ratings initially increased after Givens took over hosting duties, but soon fell. The series was canceled after this season.

In 2006, Givens attempted a return to television on MyNetworkTV's telenovela Saints and Sinners, but the show garnered low ratings and was soon canceled. Givens continued acting in made-for-television films while also making appearances on Trinity Broadcasting Network's Praise the Lord program (July 12, 2007), and Larry King Live. In June 2007, she released her autobiography Grace Will Lead Me Home. Givens returned to feature films in Tyler Perry's Southern drama The Family That Preys (2008). She also had a recurring role portraying a fictionalized version of herself on the CW comedy-drama The Game. Additionally, she has had a recurring role on the TBS show Tyler Perry's House of Payne, and a guest role on USA Network's Burn Notice. In addition to television and film roles, Givens has performed onstage. In 2001, she appeared in an off-Broadway production of The Vagina Monologues. From February to April 16, 2006, she played the role of Roxie Hart in the Broadway play Chicago. In 2007, she toured the country playing a part in the I'm Ready Productions play Men, Money & Golddiggers. Givens starred in the 2009 stage play A Mother's Prayer, which also starred Johnny Gill, Shirley Murdock, and Jermaine Crawford.

In 2007, Givens published a memoir entitled Grace Will Lead Me Home. In it, she reflects on the life of her praying grandmother, Grace, her experiences of domestic violence, her strong will to survive, feeling abandoned by her father, and her faith in God. In 2011, she guest-starred in three episodes of NBC's spy-comedy Chuck: "Chuck Versus the Masquerade", "Chuck Versus the A-Team", and "Chuck Versus the Muuurder", as Jane Bentley. Later that year, she performed as Angel, a struggling blues singer, in the play Blues for An Alabama Sky at Pasadena Playhouse. In 2015, she starred alongside Clifton Powell, Mishon Ratliff, and Malachi Malik in the segment "Mama's Boy" of TV One's anthology romance horror film Fear Files.

Givens was the spokesperson for the National Domestic Violence Hotline for several years.

In 2017, the actress hosted the San Diego Black Film Festival as she had for the several previous years.

In 2021, Givens was cast in season three of Batwoman as Jada Jet, the CEO of Jeturian Industries and Ryan Wilder's biological mother who is based on Jezebel Jet.

In 2022, Givens appeared in the Lifetime film He's Not Worth Dying For as part of its "Ripped from the Headlines" feature films that was inspired by the feud of Rachel Wade and Sarah Ludemann. She portrayed Cher Heinemann, the mother of Grace Heinemann who was based on Ludemann.

Personal life
Givens began dating boxer Mike Tyson in 1987. According to Givens, Tyson was physically abusive before they wed on February 7, 1988. Tyson stated that he was "severely traumatized by that relationship." Tyson was then estimated to have $50 million; he and Givens did not have a prenuptial agreement. During their marriage, Givens bought a $4.3 million mansion in the affluent suburb of Bernardsville, New Jersey with money withdrawn from his brokerage account. They appeared in a Diet Pepsi commercial together and on the cover of Life magazine.

After her miscarriage in June 1988, their marriage began to fall apart. Tyson claims Givens's pregnancy (and miscarriage) was a ruse only to rush him to the wedding altar, noting that in all the time she was supposedly pregnant Givens never gained a pound. In a joint interview with Tyson on 20/20 in September 1988, Givens told Barbara Walters that life with him was "torture, pure hell, worse than anything I could possibly imagine," and she went on to describe his volatile temper. In October 1988, Givens filed for divorce, citing spousal abuse and was granted a temporary restraining order. Her attorney Marvin Mitchelson said, "She loves Michael Tyson, but there is continued violence, and she fears for her safety." Tyson sought an annulment, accusing her of stealing millions of dollars and manipulating the public. Givens responded by filing a $125 million libel suit for defamation. Their divorce was finalized on Valentine's Day in 1989.

Givens received negative press following her split from Tyson, particularly within sports and the African-American community. Headlines heralded her as "the Most Hated Woman in America" and she was described as a "gold digger who married Tyson solely for his millions." Givens denied that she received a reported divorce settlement of over $10 million from Tyson, stating that she "didn't receive one dime."

According to the 1989 biography Fire and Fear: The Inside Story of Mike Tyson, Tyson admitted he punched Givens, stating "that was the best punch I've ever thrown in my entire life." Tyson later claimed the book was "filled with inaccuracies." In 2009, Tyson joked about "socking" Givens on Oprah, which caused laughter in the audience. Winfrey later issued an apology to Givens.

In 1993 Givens adopted her first son, Michael "Buddy" Givens. In 1997, she married her tennis instructor, Svetozar Marinković. Givens filed for divorce months later. In 1999, she had a second son, William "Billy" Jensen, with ex-boyfriend, tennis player Murphy Jensen.

In January 2004, Givens struck a pedestrian while driving an SUV through a Miami, Florida, intersection. Givens was ticketed for failing to use due care with a pedestrian in a crosswalk, but the charges were later dismissed. In June 2004, the injured party filed a civil lawsuit against Givens for an unspecified amount.

A May 7, 2009, article in Forbes magazine reported that the Internal Revenue Service was suing Givens for unpaid federal income taxes totaling $292,000 ($ in present-day USD when adjusted for inflation), an amount which included interest and penalties. The government had asked a federal court in Florida for a judgment against her on 39 assessments covering a span of eight years.

Filmography

Film

Television

Awards and nominations

Books

References

External links
 
 
 
 

20th-century American actresses
21st-century American actresses
American television actresses
American film actresses
American stage actresses
African-American actresses
American memoirists
Living people
Actresses from New Rochelle, New York
People from Bernardsville, New Jersey
American women memoirists
Sarah Lawrence College alumni
African-American models
Harvard Graduate School of Arts and Sciences alumni
20th-century African-American women
20th-century African-American people
21st-century African-American women
21st-century African-American people
African-American history of Westchester County, New York
1964 births